South Adelaide Panthers may refer to:

South Adelaide Football Club, Australian rules football team nicknamed Panthers
South Adelaide Panthers (basketball), member club of the South Australian state basketball league
South Adelaide Panthers FC, association football team